The King of Kings Tournament 2000 was a series of three separate mixed martial arts events held by the Fighting Network Rings (RINGS). The tournament took place in both Tokyo and Osaka between October 9, 2000 and February 24, 2001. The tournament was the second of two King of Kings tournaments.

Rules
The tournament had two qualifying events: King of Kings 2000 Block A and King of Kings 2000 Block B. The fighters who advance from the qualifying events would compete in the King of Kings 2000 Final. The fights would consist of two five-minute rounds and, as in all RINGS bouts, no striking was allowed to the head of a grounded opponent.

Interesting Facts
This tournament had many participants who went on to have great success in mixed martial arts. Antônio Rodrigo Nogueira, Randy Couture, Dave Menne, and Fedor Emelianenko all became champions in their respective organizations (PRIDE Fighting Championships and UFC).

King of Kings 2000 Block A
The first event of the tournament took place on October 9, 2000 at the Yoyogi National Stadium in Tokyo, Japan.

Results

King of Kings 2000 Block B
The second event of the tournament took place on December 22, 2000 at the Osaka Prefectural Gymnasium in Osaka, Japan.

Results

King of Kings 2000 Final
The third and final event of the tournament took place on February 24, 2001 at The Ryogoku Kokugikan Sumo Arena in Tokyo, Japan.

Results

Tournament Bracket

See also 
 Fighting Network Rings
 List of Fighting Network Rings events
 2000 in Fighting Network Rings
 2001 in Fighting Network Rings

References

Fighting Network Rings events
2000 in mixed martial arts
2001 in mixed martial arts
Mixed martial arts in Japan
Sports competitions in Osaka
Sports competitions in Tokyo